The 2007 season was São Paulo's 78th season of the club's existence. After being a national champions in the previous year, them team qualified to the Copa Libertadores and Copa Sudamericana. Tricolor took a place on the semifinals of Campeonato Paulista, but was eliminated by São Caetano with a rout in his home stadium in the second leg after drawing in 1–1 on away, was defeated by 4–1. In the Copa Libertadores for the fourth year's participation sequence, Tricolor was eliminated in Round of 16 losing to Grêmio in aggregated score. While played the Campeonato Brasileiro, São Paulo participated in Copa Sudamericana. With two draws against Figueirense the group advanced on away goal rule to Round 16 when eliminated the Argentine current champions of Copa Libertadores, Boca juniors, also in away goal rule, after scored one goal in La Bombonera in the loss by 2–1, Tricolor won in Morumbi with a single goal scored by Aloísio. However, in the quarterfinals was eliminated with two losses for Colombians Millonarios. Playing only the national league the club rising the fifth title in 31 October, on 34th round, behind the victory over América-RN for 3–0 in Morumbi. The team became a champions with a record of 23 wins, 8 draws, 7 losses and keeping the best defence of league, only 19 goals conceded in 38 matches.

Undisputed champions 

São Paulo FC reigned for the second time in the role as national champions, now with five titles. In the making of history São Paulo F.C. also broke many records, some of them set by São Paulo FC in the previous year.

Awards 

CBF gave São Paulo F.C. a trophy created in the 70s, which was designed at the time for the team who reached five titles first or three consecutive titles. Since no team ever accomplished winning three titles consecutively, São Paulo was given the trophy for winning the tournament five times. The trophy, made out of silver soccer balls, was given to all the national champions in transition order until 1992, which was the season Flamengo FC celebrated their last national title. Due to the controversy of 1987, after 1992 CBF locked the most wanted trophy for all Brazilian teams and created a new trophy to be given to the national champions.

Prestige 

São Paulo FC was considered to be the best team in Brazil at this time by various soccer entities, and it was also considered the undisputed champion of 2007 by Placar (Brazilian monthly sports magazine), with four games left and 15 points in front of the second place team (Santos FC). São Paulo F.C. broke many records in 2007; the team went 13 games without losing in the tournament, São Paulo also didn't allow any goals for eleven games, having the best defense of the tournament. São Paulo F.C. finished the tournament with 19 goals scored against, another record set in the Brasileirao. The biggest record achieved that year, was that São Paulo broke its own record as a team to win the tournament before it was even over, the year before, São Paulo F.C. was mathematically crowned the champions with three games still left to play; in 2007 São Paulo F.C. won with four games left.

Final squad

Scorers

Overall

{|class="wikitable"
|-
|Games played || 74 (21 Campeonato Paulista, 8 Copa Libertadores, 38 Campeonato Brasileiro, 6 Copa Sudamericana, 1 Friendly match)
|-
|Games won || 41 (13 Campeonato Paulista, 4 Copa Libertadores, 23 Campeonato Brasileiro, 1 Copa Sudamericana, 0 Friendly match)
|-
|Games drawn || 18 (6 Campeonato Paulista, 2 Copa Libertadores, 8 Campeonato Brasileiro, 2 Copa Sudamericana, 0 Friendly match)
|-
|Games lost || 15 (2 Campeonato Paulista, 2 Copa Libertadores, 7 Campeonato Brasileiro, 3 Copa Sudamericana, 1 Friendly match)
|-
|Goals scored || 116
|-
|Goals conceded || 52
|-
|Goal difference || +64
|-
|Best result || 6–0 (H) v Paraná - Campeonato Brasileiro - 2007.9.1 
|-
|Worst result || 1–4 (A) v São Caetano - Campeonato Paulista - 2007.4.21
|-
|Top scorer || Borges (13 goals)
|-

Friendlies

Super Soccer Cup

Official competitions

Campeonato Paulista

Record

Copa Libertadores

Record

Campeonato Brasileiro

Record

Copa Sudamericana

Record

References

Brazilian football clubs 2007 season
2007